Tactusa assamiensis is a moth of the family Erebidae first described by Michael Fibiger in 2010. It is known from Assam in India.

The wingspan is about 11.5 mm. There is a very large, triangular, dark-brown and brown patch on the forewing that extends from the antemedial point on the costa to the apex, including the fringes and tornal edge. There is also a large patch in the middle which is slightly lighter brown. Only the terminal lines are visible as blackish-brown interneural spots. The fringes are basally whitish, together forming a line. The hindwing is dark grey, with an indistinct discal spot and the underside is unicolorous grey.

References

Micronoctuini
Taxa named by Michael Fibiger
Moths described in 2010